Rolf Schmidt (born 31 October 1963) is a German sailor. He competed in the men's 470 event at the 1992 Summer Olympics.

References

External links
 

1963 births
Living people
German male sailors (sport)
Olympic sailors of Germany
Sailors at the 1992 Summer Olympics – 470
Sportspeople from Berlin